Wauchope may refer to

Places
Wauchope, New South Wales
Wauchope, Saskatchewan
Wauchope Forest, Scotland
Wauchope, Scottish Borders
Wauchope, Dumfries and Galloway
Wauchope, Northern Territory

People
Andrew  Gilbert Wauchope (1846–1899), British soldier; killed in action at Magersfontein, South Africa
Andrew Ramsay Don-Wauchope, Scottish rugby player
Archibald Wauchope of Niddrie, Scottish landowner
Sir Arthur Grenfell Wauchope (1874–1947), British soldier and colonial administrator.
Robert Wauchope (archaeologist) (1909–1979), American archaeologist
Robert Wauchope (archbishop) (fl. 1539–1551), Archbishop of Armagh
Robert Wauchope (Royal Navy officer) (1788–1862), Royal Navy Admiral and Inventor of the time ball

Other uses
Don-Wauchope baronets